Tatiana Georgette Kalil Roha (born May 19, 2002) is an Ecuadorian model and a beauty pageant titleholder who was crowned Miss International Ecuador 2023. She will  represent Ecuador at the Miss International 2023 Pageant.

Early life and education 
Kalil was born in Guayaquil, Ecuador on May 19, 2002. And she is the daughter of Elias Kalil and Tatiana Roha. She is currently studying bachelor's degree in clinical psychology at Universidad Católica de Santiago de Guayaquil. She speaks Spanish, English and little French and she aspires to learn Japanese basic for the contest.

Pageantry

Miss Ecuador 2022 
Kalil began her pageantry career in 2022. On June 11, 2022 she was announced as one of the 18 official contestants for Miss Ecuador 2022. Where she represent a her city Guayaquil  in the national beauty contest. On September 3, 2022 competed at the Malecón Eloy Alfaro in Quevedo. During the final, Kalil was awarded as "Miss Catrice" (Best Face) of the pageant by the sponsor. After that advanced into the Top ten and then into the Top six. After reaching the Top six, she placed as the 1st Runner-Up. Where she was crowned in the final as the winner of Miss International Ecuador 2023 by her predecessor, Valeria Gutiérrez.

Miss International 2023 
As the winner of Miss International Ecuador 2023, Kalil will represent Ecuador at the 61st edition of Miss International 2023 pageant, to be held 2023 in Japan.

References

External links

 

2002 births
Living people
Ecuadorian beauty pageant winners
Miss Ecuador
People from Guayaquil